Chasing Shadows is the third and final studio album by the Florida-based metal band Black Tide. It was released on October 16, 2015. This is the first official studio release to not feature original bassist Zakk Sandler and drummer Steven Spence. The album's first single titled "Angel in the Dark" was released on September 15, 2015.

Track listing

Personnel
 Gabriel Garcia: vocals, lead guitar, Bass guitar
 Austin Diaz: rhythm guitar, backing vocals
 Cody Paige: drums, percussion

References

2015 albums
Black Tide albums